A bridgehead is a military fortification that protects the end of a bridge that is closest to the enemy.

Bridgehead may also refer to:

 Bridgehead Coffee, a Canadian coffeehouse business
 "Bridgehead" atoms in a bicyclic molecule or polycyclic compound, shared by two or more cycles
 BridgeHead Software, a software company
 A headline in a book that is outside the normal hierarchy of sections